The Jacobite peerage includes those peerages created by James II and VII, and the subsequent Jacobite pretenders, after James's deposition from the thrones of England, Scotland and Ireland following the Glorious Revolution of 1688. These creations were not recognised in English, Scots or Irish law, but the titles were used in Jacobite circles in Continental Europe and recognised by France, Spain and the Papacy.

Jacobite peerages ceased to be created after 1760 except for a title created by the "Young Pretender", Prince Charles Edward Stuart, for his illegitimate daughter in or before 1783. The following tables list the peerages and baronetcies created by the Stuart claimants in exile.

Sources
An authoritative list of the Jacobite peerage does not exist. The standard source relied on is The Jacobite Peerage, Baronetage, Knightage and Grants of Honour published in 1904 by Melville Henry Massue, who called himself 'Marquis de Ruvigny et Raineval'. However, as a source, it is unreliable. Peter Drummond-Murray of Mastrick noted in an article in Burke's Peerage that:

Dukes

Marquesses

Earls

Viscounts

Barons and Lords of Parliament

Barons in the peerage of England

Lords of Parliament in the peerage of Scotland

Barons in the peerage of Ireland

Baronets

Baronets of England

Baronets of Nova Scotia

Baronets of Ireland

Knights of the Garter and Knights of the Thistle

Knights of the Most Honourable Order of the Garter

Knights of the Most Ancient and Most Noble Order of the Thistle

References

 

 
Peerages in the Jacobite peerage